The Yellow Foal (Hungarian: Sárga csikó) is a 1913 Hungarian silent drama film directed by Félix Vanyl and starring Lili Berky, Gyula Nagy and Victor Varconi. It is known by several alternative titles including Son of the Pusta and The Secret of a Blind Man. The film was made by producer Jenő Janovics in partnership with the French company Pathé. The film was a massive success and was exported to nearly forty countries worldwide. On the back of the film's success Janovics built his Corvin Film company into a leading studio, attracting talented Hungarian actors, writer and technicians away from the capital Budapest to work for him in Kolozsvár.

Cast

References

Bibliography
 Cunningham, John. Hungarian Cinema: From Coffee House to Multiplex. Wallflower Press, 2004.

External links

1913 films
Hungarian silent films
Hungarian drama films
1910s Hungarian-language films
Hungarian black-and-white films
Austro-Hungarian films
1913 drama films
Silent drama films